Stuart Jones may refer to:

Stuart Jones (cricketer) (1929–2015), New Zealand cricketer
Stuart Jones (cyclist) (born 1969), Australian Para cyclist
Stuart Jones (footballer, born 1977), English football goalkeeper
Stuart Jones (footballer, born 1984), Welsh football defender
Stuart Jones (golfer) (1925–2012), New Zealand golfer
Stuart Jones (rugby league) (born 1981), professional rugby league player for Castleford Tigers
Stuart Jones (historian), British historian
Stuart E. Jones, American diplomat
Stuart Alan Jones, a fictional character from the TV series Queer as Folk
Stuart "Slim" Jones, American baseball player
Stewart Jones (politician), American politician and member of the South Carolina House of Representatives